The Dhammayazika Pagoda is a Buddhist temple located in the village of Pwasaw (located east of Bagan) in Myanmar. It was built in 1196 during the reign of King Narapatisithu. The pagoda is circular in design, and is made of brick. Its three terraces contain terra cotta tiles illustrating scenes from the Jataka.

References

External links
 MyanmarBagan Travel Information

Pagodas in Myanmar
1196 establishments in Asia
12th-century Buddhist temples
Bagan
Religious buildings and structures completed in 1196